Paranoid Time is the debut EP by American hardcore punk band Minutemen. It is also the second ever release by the SST record label, founded by Black Flag's Greg Ginn and Chuck Dukowski. The album cover is a drawing by the American artist Raymond Pettibon.

Background
Minutemen's first record occurred almost immediately after they opened for Black Flag in Minutemen's hometown of San Pedro, California. Black Flag guitarist Greg Ginn offered the group a chance to record and release a record, and a late night session at Media Art Studio in Hermosa Beach, California was booked.

Recording 
The group recorded all seven songs in the order in which they appear on the record, with no overdubbing except for backing vocals by the group and drummer George Hurley's brother Greg.  At the beginning of "Joe McCarthy's Ghost", bassist Mike Watt can be heard telling guitarist D. Boon and the Hurley brothers, "You just sing 'Joe McCarthy', want to do that?". A discussion between the four participants can be heard underneath George Hurley's previously recorded drum introduction.

Ginn later told Minutemen how to put out a record, which spurred Watt and Boon to form New Alliance Records later that year.

The EP also appears as part of the My First Bells cassette (1985) and the Post-Mersh Vol. 3 CD.  Two tracks from the EP, "Paranoid Chant" and "The Maze" appeared on the SST compilation The Blasting Concept.

A sample of the intro to "Joe McCarthy's Ghost" can be heard on one of the radio ads compiled on the "Crass Commercialism" track on Black Flag's Everything Went Black album.

Packaging 
Early released copies of the EP were printed with black artwork.  All other editions are green. In 1982, in Trouser Press, Robert Payes said the record is "a must for the savage Ray Pettibone artwork alone." The following year, however, Byron Coley - writing for The Boston Phoenix - would note that the artwork didn't fit the music.

Reception 

John Leland and Ira Robbins wrote in Trouser Press that the EP "offers dogmatic politics redeemed by idiosyncratic Wire-type songs. Kicked along by drummer George Hurley, each abbreviated blurt of rhythm serves as a backdrop for the rants of bassist Mike Watt and guitarist D. Boon. The best is the apocalyptic “Paranoid Chant,” in which Boon screams, “I don’t even worry about crime anymore.”" According to Robert Christgau - who commented on it in his review of the band's first full-length album - the EP "could pass for speed-rock". Coley was more mixed: he found that the band's early music "didn't give much leeway to the imagination", going on to criticize the band's seriousness and the "naive wordplay" in their lyrics.

A retrospective review by Stephen Thomas Erlewine for AllMusic found the EP to be "a startlingly coherent set of primal minimalism -- a cross between Californian hardcore punk and the succinct experimentalism of Wire. It speeds by too quickly for any particular song to stand out, but the band's terse, frenetic energy is invigorating, as are their imaginative ideas." In a 2022 review of their second LP, Huw Baines says of Paranoid Time, "all the pieces are in the right places, from Watt’s wandering bass to Boon’s history-lesson-with-footnotes rants and lacerating leads". In a perfect score review from 2008, Punknews.org reviewer John concluded that Paranoid Time "is infinitely important to independent rock. There is no excuse not to own it."

Track listing

Personnel
Minutemen
D. Boon - guitar, vocals
Mike Watt - bass, vocals
George Hurley - drums, backing vocals
with:
Greg Hurley - backing vocals on "Joe McCarthy's Ghost" and "Paranoid Chant"

Production
Greg Ginn - record producer
Spot - engineer

References

Minutemen (band) albums
1980 debut EPs
SST Records EPs